Dean Plocher (born March 11, 1970) is an American politician who has served in the Missouri House of Representatives from the 89th district since 2016.  He was elected speaker of the Missouri House of Representatives on January 4, 2023, and is currently serving.

Electoral history

References

|-

1970 births
21st-century American politicians
Living people
Republican Party members of the Missouri House of Representatives
Speakers of the Missouri House of Representatives